Brotality is an American thrash and groove metal band that originated out of Narrowsburg, New York. The band began in 2016 between brothers Bryce (guitars/vocals) and Reece Maopolski (bass/vocals). In 2018, the band was joined by Liam Fenton on drums and the band began to record and perform shows alongside the likes of Knocked Loose, Red, Deep Purple, and Judas Priest. The band cites Mastodon, Alice Cooper, Metallica, Silent Planet, August Burns Red, and many others as influences.

History
Brotality began in 2016 between brothers Bryce and Reece Maopolski who performed guitars and bass, respectfully, with both handling vocals. The band, however, did not come to completion until the brothers met Liam Fenton in 2018, who would join the band on drums. With Fenton in the band, the three released their debut EP, which was titled Hypernova. However, this EP was recorded by Bryce, performing guitars, bass, and drums, with Reece and Liam not participating. Later that year, in September 2018, the band would open for both Deep Purple and Judas Priest. The following year, the band released "Painmonger", followed by their sophomore EP titled The Provocation in March 2019. The EP featured the whole band this time, a major departure from the djent sound of the first release. Bryce would also mix and master the release. In September 2019, the band released "Legions Fall", set to be their debut single off their upcoming album.

In March 2020, the band signed with Rottweiler Records, a label out of Fort Wayne, Indiana, which is also home to bands such as Symphony of Heaven, Taking the Head of Goliath, Soul Embraced, and Skald in Veum. Their signing also saw the release of their next single, "Salting the Wound". On June 26, 2020, the band debuted their lyric video for "Spiral Out", which would later release on July 3. The band also participated in a tribute show to Steve Rowe of Mortification, which was put on by Exodo Festival, covering the song "Gut Wrench" off of Primitive Rhythm Machine. 

On October 16, 2020, the band released their second D45, Foxhole, which featured both "Foxhole" and "Dirtnap". On October 17, 2020, the band premiered their debut music video, "Foxhole". The band's debut album, Worldwide Desolation, was released on February 5, 2021 through Rottweiler to very positive reviews. On September 28th, the band announced Liam Fenton's departure in pursuit of his personal life, playing his last show on October 3rd, 2021. With Fenton's departure, Tanner Snyder and Tyler Tompkins were called to fill-in until a replacement could be found. Snyder played a handful of shows, with Tompkins covering for five months until March 2, 2022, when John Haring was hired and announced as the newest member of the band.

Members
Current
Bryce Maopolski – guitars, vocals (2016–present), bass, drum programming (2018)
Reece Maopolski – bass, vocals (2016–present)
John Haring – drums (2022–present)

Former
Liam Fenton – drums, backing vocals (2018–2021)

Live
Tanner Snyder – drums (2021)
Tyler Tompkins – drums (2021-2022)

Timeline

Discography
Studio albums
Worldwide Desolation (2021)
The Woods Will End You (2022)

EPs
Hypernova (2018)
The Provocation (2019)
Foxhole (2020)
Prisoners of the Abyss (2020)

Singles
"Painmonger" (2019)
"Legion Falls" (2019)
"Salting the Wound" (2020)
"Spiral Out" (2020)
"Foxhole" (2020)
"Dirtnap" (2020)
"Prisoners of the Abyss" (2020)
"Nosedive" (2021)

References

External links
Liam Fenton of Brotality on the Up and Coming Drummer podcast

Musical groups established in 2016
American thrash metal musical groups
American groove metal musical groups
American Christian metal musical groups
Djent
Rottweiler Records artists
2016 establishments in New York (state)